Eastleigh Airport may refer to:

 Moi Air Base, formerly RAF Eastleigh and Eastleigh Airport, Kenya.
 Southampton Airport, formerly Eastleigh airfield and RAF Eastleigh, England